This is an overview of the progression of the World record in track para-cycling for the 500m women's time trial as recognised by the Union Cycliste Internationale (UCI).

Current classifications

C5 Progression

C4 Progression

C3 Progression

C2 Progression

C1 Progression

B Progression (1000m)

References

Track cycling Olympic record progressions